Mannes Francken (1888–1948) was a Dutch football player, who played for HFC and the Dutch national team.

Biography
Francken started out as a goalkeeper, but quickly became a forward. He made his international debut for the Netherlands on 29 April 1906 in a 5-0 away defeat to Belgium. He would go on to play 22 caps, scoring 17 goals, including a then national record of three hat-tricks, all of which against Belgium. Remarkably, 12 of his international goals, including his three hat-tricks, came in friendly cup duels between Dutch and Belgians, a tally that makes him the all-time top scorer in the competition's history, however, if we include the four unofficial trophies between 1901 and 1904 then he shares this position with Herbert Potts of Belgium. The final of these goals, against Belgium on 9 March 1913, made him the all-time top scorer for the Netherlands, a record he held for more than 20 years, until when on 3 November 1935, Beb Bakhuys of HBS Craeyenhout scored his 18th goal for the Dutch national team. Nevertheless, a century after his last match Francken is still ranked 11th in the list of all-time top scorers.

Francken played his final match for the Netherlands in 1914. He moved to the Dutch East Indies in 1916. Francken died in 1948.

His brothers Harry, Jacques and Peddy Francken also played for HFC.

Career statistics
Scores and results list Netherlands's goal tally first, score column indicates score after each Francken goal.

Records
All-time top goal scorer of the Rotterdamsch Nieuwsblad Beker with 8 goals
All-time top goal scorer of the Belgium vs Netherlands Cups with 13 goals

References

Inez Hollander, Silenced Voices: Uncovering a Family's Colonial History in Indonesia, Ohio University Press, 2008, 

1888 births
1948 deaths
Dutch footballers
Netherlands international footballers
HFC Haarlem players
Sportspeople from East Java
Footballers from Haarlem
Association football goalkeepers
Koninklijke HFC players